Vitaphone Racing is a German racing team who participate in the FIA GT Championship. The team is actually Bartels Motor & Sport GmbH but runs under the title of their primary sponsor, Vitaphone GmbH. In 2011 Vitaphone Racing was renamed Vita4One. They have successfully raced the Maserati MC12 GT1 since 2005, becoming one of the most successful GT teams in the series with five FIA GT1 Teams' Championship and four FIA GT1 Drivers' Championship. The team consists of 32 people and is led by Rafael Calafell. Their chief drivers are Michael Bartels and Andrea Bertolini.

Racing history

The Vitaphone Racing team has enjoyed success in the FIA GT, GT1 class championship. In 2004 they initially campaigned a Saleen S7-R, coming in fourth in the teams championship. Although racing under their own entrant name, the car was in actuality run by Konrad Motorsport.

In 2005 they switched to the Maserati MC12 and won the FIA GT teams championship ahead of JMB Racing (also racing a Maserati MC12) allowing Maserati to win the FIA GT Manufacturers Title. In 2006 Vitaphone Racing again won the FIA GT Teams Title, and their drivers Andrea Bertolini and Michael Bartels tied each other for the Drivers' Title.

In 2007, they once again won both the Driver and Teams Championships, this time with Thomas Biagi the sole Drivers Champion, because the regular co-driver that year, Michael Bartels, missed races at Silverstone and Bucharest, with Mika Salo and Fabrizio Gollin taking his place at each of those rounds respectively. Also, Bartels did not receive the points for finishing 6th at Zhuhai, as he did not complete the required 35 minutes of time in the car.

2008 would be another successful year for the team, with Bartels and Bertolini repeating their success of 2006, and also winning the Spa 24 Hours alongside fellow Vitaphone drivers Miguel Ramos and Alexandre Negrão. Vitaphone also claimed the Teams' Championship for the fourth consecutive year.

They also entered an Aston Martin DBR9 at the 24 Hours of Le Mans in 2008, as the Maserati MC12 was not eligible as a GT1 car under ACO's technical regulations.

In 2009 they won their fifth consecutive Teams' Championship, with Bartels and Bertolini being Drivers' Champions for the third time.

They have continued their GT programme in 2010, entering two updated Maserati MC12 to contest the new FIA GT1 World Championship. They became the inaugural GT1 World Champions at the 2010 FIA GT1 San Luis round winning both Drivers and Teams Championships with Bartels and Bertolini taking the Drivers Championship.

For the 2011 season, Vitaphone withdrew from the GT1 World Championship and will compete in the new Blancpain Endurance Series with 2 Ferrari 458, one of which will be driven by team owner Michael Bartels and Andrea Bertolini.

In 2012 the team (as Vita4One) entered the FIA GT1 World Championship again in a BMW Z4.

References

External links
 

German auto racing teams
FIA GT Championship teams
European Le Mans Series teams
FIA GT1 World Championship teams
ADAC GT Masters teams
Blancpain Endurance Series teams
British GT Championship teams
24 Hours of Le Mans teams